Ashley Kozak (c.1930 – 2008) was a British jazz bassist, record producer and artists' manager, best known as having been Donovan's manager.

After working, and recording, with Tony Crombie and His Orchestra in 1954, together with leading UK-based jazz musicians such as Crombie, Dizzy Reece, Joe Temperley and Harry South, Kozak went on to join the Vic Ash Quartet, which recorded with Maxine Sullivan. He later joined the Don Rendell Sextet (1954–55) and The Ivor and Basil Kirchin Band (1955–56), together with Stan Tracey, and was later with the Basil Kirchin Small Band. He recorded again with Tony Crombie in 1957 for the 10" Long Player, 'Rockin' with the Rockets', (Columbia Records (UK:33S1108), with Red Mitchell on bass.

By 1962 he was leading his own quartet, which included Harry South and Dick Morrissey, and spent several months in India.

Shortly after their return to the UK, Kozak started working as an executive at Brian Epstein's NEMS Enterprises, as well as managing artists such as Shawn Phillips (1965–67), Donovan (1965 to May 1968), and the duo Michael-Claire (1968).

He produced Marc Brierley's second album for CBS Records, Hello (1969), the band Clear Blue Sky (1970–71), and put together the band Tranquility, who were described as a "hybrid of pop, rock and English folk music", and were active from 1971 to 1974.

Kozak died in 2008.

Discography
1954: Maxine Sullivan, voc; acc. by Vic Ash Quartet: Vic Ash, cl; Ralph Dollimore, p; Ashley Kozak, b; Ralph Green, d - London
1955: Meet Don Rendell - Don Rendell 
1957: Rockin' with The Rockets - Tony Crombie and His Rockets (Red Morris, Jimmy Currie, Ashley Kozak, Red Mitchell, Clyde Ray) - Columbia 33S 1108

References

External links

Year of birth uncertain
2008 deaths
British jazz double-bassists
Male double-bassists
British male jazz musicians
British record producers
British music managers